Edward Chaffin Tully (April 16, 1826 in Memphis, Tennessee March 3, 1907 in Bitterwater, California) served as a member of the 1859–1860 California State Assembly, representing the 4th District. During the Mexican–American War he served in the US Army.

References

External links

Join California E. C. Tully

1826 births
1907 deaths
19th-century American politicians
Democratic Party members of the California State Assembly
Politicians from Memphis, Tennessee